The Jalgaon Municipal Corporation is the administrative body of the city of Jalgaon in the Indian state of Maharashtra.

The Municipal Corporation is composed of democratically elected members and currently headed by Mayor Jayshree Mahajan of Shiv Sena. It administers the city's infrastructure and public services. Jalgaon Municipal Corporation (founded March 21, 2003) serves an area of 68.78 km2 and provides civil services and facilities for approximately 460,000 people. Jalgaon Municipal Corporation has been formed with functions to improve the infrastructure of town.

Revenue sources 

The following are the Income sources for the corporation from the Central and State Government.

Revenue from taxes 
Following is the Tax related revenue for the corporation.

 Property tax.
 Profession tax.
 Entertainment tax.
 Grants from Central and State Government like Goods and Services Tax.
 Advertisement tax.

Revenue from non-tax sources 

Following is the Non Tax related revenue for the corporation.

 Water usage charges.
 Fees from Documentation services.
 Rent received from municipal property.
 Funds from municipal bonds.

Mayors of Jalgaon

Deputy Mayors of Jalgaon

List of Chairman, Standing Committee

Alliance Composition

History 
In 1996, the officials of the corporation built 200 houses for individuals living below the poverty line. The project tender attracted 11 responses. Khandesh Builders was awarded the contract.

Housing scam 

The Jalgaon Housing Scam was publicized in 2012. It was alleged that documents were forged and deadlines illegally overridden by firms owned by Suresh Jain and Gulabrao Devkar, the sitting ministers of Maharashtra.

The scam was exposed when Praveen Gedam, the municipal commissioner of Jalgaon, filed a First Information Report against Jain and Devkar. Chandrakant Sonawane, a member of the 13th Maharashtra Legislative Assembly and the architect of the project, along with 90 others, were sued for providing forged documents and also for delaying and overriding multiple deadlines. After years of court proceedings, Dhule District Court sentenced Jain and Devkar to seven and five years in prison, respectively, under the Prevention of Corruption Act, 1988, India Penal Code Section 420, and many sections of corruption, misuse of office, cheating, theft of taxpayer money, submitting forged documents, fraud, and confidence tricks. The Jalgaon housing scam was one of the largest scams of Maharashtra, totaling Rs 110-crore. Investigation revealed that Minister Suresh Jain, Gulabrao Devkar, Khandesh Builders, the architects, and other corporates conspired to exploit the Government of India's affordable housing initiative, Pradhan Mantri Awas Yojana–then called the Gharkul scheme.

A police investigation led by IPS officer Ishu Sindhu exposed that the owners of Khandesh Builders were friends with Suresh Jain and that the entity's headquarters were located at Jain's residence. The money given by Jalgaon Municipal Corporation to Khandesh Builders first advanced Rs 15-crore then Rs 45-crore routed to firms owned by Jain's friends and family members. Builders started work on 5,000 houses but completed only 1,500.

References

Jalgaon Municipal Corporation News

2003 establishments in Maharashtra
Jalgaon
Municipal corporations in Maharashtra